Belgh Brasse is a brewery in Amos, in the Abitibi region of Northwestern Quebec, Canada.

History
The business was founded in 1999 by Jean-Louis Marcoux, a Belgian brewmaster, in Amos, Quebec. At the beginning, the business was selling the beer "8". In 2004, Jean-Louis Marcoux, a devoted entrepreneur and beer brewing passionate, brought together some private investors to grow the brewery.

In 2007 the business was purchased by Groupe Geloso.

In 2011 Belgh Brasse launched a new product, the beer Mons.

Following a fire at its Amos location in 2017, the business was relocated to the premises of Groupe Geloso in Laval, Quebec in 2019.

Previous Products
8

Their first product was called "8", a Belgian-style bottle-fermenting beer. This beer is not on the market anymore.

Taïga

Their second product was the Taïga, a golden ale launched at Christmas 2004. The water for this beer was taken from a local esker; the high quality of this water was one of the reasons for the beer's success. This beer is not on the market anymore.

Current Products
Mons

An abbey ale line is called Mons. This is a product line of three abbey ale inspired beers. They have a white beer (Abbey Witte), a blonde beer (Abbey Blonde), a dubell (Abbey Dubbel) and a Quadruppel (Abbey Quadruppel).
The water used to brew those beers still comes from an esker from Abitibi. The name Mons is inspired by the city of Mons, where Jean-Louis Marcoux, the brewmaster was born. This beer already has success in United States and in Canada.

La Bittt à Tibbi

This is a line of beers the brewer says is inspired by the music and poetry of Raôul Duguay. These each have a boreal forest animal on the label. The original three released were a Pale Ale (Moose); Blond Lager (Bear); and Kristall Witte (Wolf). Subsequently, three more were added: an India Pale Ale (Arctic Hare); Red Ale (Fox); and Pilsner (Beaver). By 2022, a White Beer (Owl) was added.

Awards 
The Mons Abbey Witte beer won a bronze medal in the category Wheat Beer—Belgian Style White/Wit at the Canadian Brewing awards 2012; gold medals in the category in 2016 and 2019; and a silver medal in 2020 in the category Wheat Beer—Belgian-Style Strong Ale Pale/Dark/Specialty.

See also
 Beer in Canada

References

External links
 Official website (English)

Companies based in Quebec
Beer brewing companies based in Quebec
Food and drink companies established in 1999
1999 establishments in Quebec